The kidnapping of Silvia Melis was a kidnapping for extortion that took place in Ogliastra, Sardinia, Italy, in 1997. The fact is also known for the involvement of individuals such as Nicola Grauso, then editor of L'Unione Sarda, judge Luigi Lombardini, the director of L'Unione sarda Antonangelo Liori and photojournalist Antonello Zappadu. The kidnapping lasted 265 days.

History
On 19 February 1997, Silvia Melis, entrepreneur and labor consultant from Tortolì, daughter of a wealthy engineer, was kidnapped as she was returning home by car. The bandits take her away after having tied, blindfolded and gagged her, leaving her four-year-old son Luca in the car. On July 15, the negotiations with the kidnappers entered the final phase, but the meeting with the bandits for the payment of the ransom did not take place. A priest friend of his asked investigative photojournalist Antonello Zappadu to deliver a message to the kidnappers. Melis was transferred to a tent for the last 74 days, until she managed to free herself on 11 November of the same year and was found near Nuoro on the side of a provincial road by two plainclothes agents.

The Melis family claimed they did not pay any ransoms. Nicola Grauso, an entrepreneur, revealed instead that he had paid the ransom for the liberation of the kidnapped girl in the Esterzili and Ulassai campaigns. The Cagliari judiciary would deny that it was true, asserting that Silvia Melis would have freed herself. However Grauso will maintain his positions, ending up under investigation for attempted extortion against Tito Melis and for slander against the judges. It was suspected that fugitive Attilio Cubeddu was the organizer of the kidnapping, so far his guilt has not been proven. Various hypotheses about the ransom followed, including the one that would have been paid by SISDE, which the Minister of the Interior Giorgio Napolitano defined as "just fantasies", until on 20 November when Tito Melis himself declared that he had paid the ransom himself, of which one billion lire made available by him, 400 million by Grauso and another billion by unspecified entities.

Investigation
Melis told the investigators that she had been held captive in five different places which were later identified during the investigations except for one, a cave. On 29 May 1999, Antonio Maria Marini, his mother Grazia Marine, Pasqualino Rubanu and Andrea Nieddu were arrested. Witness Anna Maria Rubatta, a neighbor of Grazia Marine, told investigators that on the night of 5 June 1997, she had seen Marini and Rubanu leave the house in Nuoro with a hooded person. Rubatta later retracted the allegations by renouncing the protection program.

Trials
In the trial of the kidnappers, conducted in first instance and on appeal by judges Mauro Mura and Gilberto Ganassi, Marini, Grazia Marine and Rubanu were found guilty. During the first instance trial, on 4 June 2001, Marini was sentenced to 30 years in prison, Rubanu to 26 years and Grazia Marine to 25 years and six months; the fourth defendant, Nieddu, was acquitted for not having committed the crime.

The appeal process on 20 December 2002 overturned the sentence by acquitting all three defendants but a year later, on 23 October 2003, the Cassation annulled the second degree sentence by arranging a new appeal process. In the bis appeal process, Marini, his mother Grazia Marine and Rubanu, Silvia Melis' kidnappers, were found guilty by the Sassari Court of Appeal which sentenced them, confirming the sentence of the first instance judges. 30 years in prison were inflicted on Marini, 26 years on Rubanu, while Grazia Marine was sentenced to 25 years and six months.

Controversy
Silvia Melis's father started a second negotiation which concluded the agreement for two billion to be paid in one go, on 4 November from Grauso who met the gang's emissaries and handed over the money. Meanwhile, Silvia Melis had already been transferred to the tent between Orgosolo and Nuoro, where her jailer loosened the chain and then moved away to allow the young woman to leave, reaching the road where she is rescued by a passing car. The truth was not told because the law on the freezing of assets had been circumvented. Silvia would have been kept hidden in a friend's house for a couple more days, the time to organize a credible release. On the 11th afternoon, Silvia would have returned to the mountains, being found on the side of the road by some motorists who would like to help her; she allegedly refused to wait for the police. This version has always been rejected by the Melis family; even 20 years after the kidnapping Silvia Melis claimed to have freed herself, while the jailer (a man never arrested and perhaps died a few years later of illness) had gone away to retrieve food after having left the chain loose by mistake. Melis allegedly spent a few hours at the commissioner's house, where she was able to wash after 9 months, and put on clean clothes provided by the official's wife.

References 

1990s missing person cases
1997 crimes in Italy
History of Sardinia
February 1997 crimes
February 1997 events in Europe
Formerly missing people
Kidnappings in Italy
Kidnapped Italian people
Missing person cases in Italy